Young Elk (1770–1795) was a chief of the Omaha tribe.

The Diary of Hosea Stout describes him as the son of Big Elk, and says that he was involved in peace negotiations with a group of Mormons regarding return of six stolen horses.

It is not clear whether Young Elk and Standing Elk, a son of Big Elk, are the same person.

References

External links 

Standing Elk (Omaha), photographs by F. A. Rinehart, 1898, 1, 2, 3

1770 births
1795 deaths
Native American leaders